Rabid Rider is a 2010 3D computer-animated Looney Tunes short film featuring the characters Wile E. Coyote and the Road Runner. Directed by Matthew O'Callaghan and written by Tom Sheppard, the film was first shown in theaters before Warner Bros.' feature-length film Yogi Bear. In 2014, Warner Bros. Animation published this short on YouTube. The film also came before the 2018 theatrical re-release of Batman: Mask of the Phantasm.

A 4D version – enhanced with physical effects like vibration, flashing lights and blasts of air – runs in a specially equipped theatre at the Cincinnati Zoo.

Plot 
Wile E. Coyote intends to use an ACME Hyper Sonic Transport to catch the Road Runner, but the transport has inherent problems of its own.

Release 
Rabid Rider was released theatrically by Warner Bros. with Yogi Bear.

Home media
The short was also released on the Yogi Bear Blu-ray.

The short was included on the Looney Tunes Super Stars' Road Runner and Wile E. Coyote: Supergenius Hijinks DVD. It was also included as a bonus on the DVD release of Looney Tunes: Rabbits Run.

References

External links 
 
 Rabid Rider on YouTube

2010 3D films
2010 animated films
2010 short films
2010 computer-animated films
2010s American animated films
American comedy short films
2010s animated short films
4D films
Looney Tunes shorts
Reel FX Creative Studios short films
Short films directed by Matthew O'Callaghan
Films scored by Christopher Lennertz
Warner Bros. Animation animated short films
Wile E. Coyote and the Road Runner films
3D animated short films
2010s Warner Bros. animated short films
Animated films without speech
American animated short films
Films about Canis
Animated films about mammals
Animated films about birds